Barkhamsted is a town in Litchfield County, Connecticut, United States. It contains seven villages: West Hill, Mallory, Barkhamsted Center, Center Hill, Washington Hill, Pleasant Valley, and Riverton. The population was 3,647 at the 2020 census, down from 3,799 at the 2010 census. The town incorporated in 1779. Barkhamsted was named after Berkhamsted, Hertfordshire, England.

Geography
The town is in northeastern Litchfield County and is bordered to the north and east by Hartford County. Major bodies of water include Barkhamsted Reservoir, the primary water source for Hartford; Lake McDonough, and the Farmington River. A high percentage of the land in the town is owned by the state of Connecticut as state forest (Peoples State Forest, American Legion State Forest, Tunxis State Forest, and Enders State Forest) and by the Metropolitan District Commission (MDC) as water supply area.

U.S. Route 44 crosses the southwest part of the town, leading southeast  to Hartford and northwest  to North Canaan.

Principal communities
Barkhamsted Center
Barkhamsted Hollow (historical; became the Barkhamsted Reservoir in the early 20th century)
Center Hill
Pleasant Valley
Riverton

Demographics

As of 2010 Barkhamsted had a population of 3,799.  The racial composition of the population was 97.5% white, 0.3% black or African American, 0.6% Asian, 0.6% from some other race and 1.1% reporting two or more races.  1.5% of the population was Hispanic or Latino of any race.

As of the census of 2000, there were 3,494 people, 1,334 households, and 1,036 families residing in the town. The racial makeup of the town was 98.54% White, 0.06% African American, 0.17% Native American, 0.40% Asian, 0.29% from other races, and 0.54% from two or more races. Hispanic or Latino of any race were 0.89% of the population.

There were 1,334 households, out of which 36.2% had children under the age of 18 living with them, 68.2% were married couples living together, 6.2% had a female householder with no husband present, and 22.3% were non-families. 16.9% of all households were made up of individuals, and 4.9% had someone living alone who was 65 years of age or older.  The average household size was 2.62 and the average family size was 2.95.

In the town, the population was spread out, with 25.0% under the age of 18, 4.8% from 18 to 24, 31.3% from 25 to 44, 28.8% from 45 to 64, and 10.1% who were 65 years of age or older.  The median age was 40 years. For every 100 females, there were 101.3 males.  For every 100 females age 18 and over, there were 100.8 males.

The median income for a household in the town was $65,972, and the median income for a family was $73,218. Males had a median income of $51,925 versus $38,102 for females. The per capita income for the town was $28,961.  About 1.8% of families and 3.0% of the population were below the poverty line, including 3.8% of those under age 18 and 1.4% of those age 65 or over.

Services
The town of Barkhamsted has one elementary school, in the village of Pleasant Valley.

Its high school and middle school students attend Northwestern Regional Middle School and Northwestern Regional High School, of the Northwestern Regional School District No. 7, in neighboring Winsted. Barkhamsted schoolchildren attend the Regional High/Middle School with students from three neighboring towns, New Hartford, Norfolk, and Colebrook.

Barkhamsted has three fire departments: the Pleasant Valley Volunteer Fire Department, Riverton Volunteer Fire Company, and Barkhamsted East Volunteer Fire Company. The town employs one paid daytime driver/firefighter to assist the volunteers during normal work hours.

Emergency medical care is provided by the Winsted Area Ambulance Association, the New Hartford Volunteer Ambulance Association, and a Campion paramedic. Both Winsted and New Hartford are volunteer-based services.

Transportation
There is no public transportation in Barkhamsted. The principal means of transportation is the automobile. The primary state highways in town are Route 44, Route 20, Route 219, Route 318, and Route 181. The village of Riverton is located along Route 20 and the village of Pleasant Valley is off Route 44 (via Route 318). Bradley International Airport is approximately 30 miles east.

Notable locations

Barkhamsted is home of the historic Saville Dam, forming Barkhamsted Reservoir, and Peoples State Forest, where the Stone Museum is located.

Within the Barkhamsted Reservoir lie the foundations of Barkhamsted Hollow, the historic center of town that was purchased by the Metropolitan District Commission of Connecticut in the early 20th century to create a reservoir to serve the Hartford area. This area was flooded following the construction of the Saville Dam on the East Branch of the Farmington River, and took eight years to fill.

Just south of the Barkhamsted Reservoir is Lake McDonough, also known as the compensating reservoir and owned by the MDC. Originally created to ensure the riparian rights of downstream mill owners, this lake now serves the recreational interests of the surrounding area with beaches, boating, and fishing.

The hamlet of Pleasant Valley contains the Pleasant Valley General Store, the Barkhamsted Elementary School, the Pleasant Valley Drive-In, the post office (ZIP Code 06063), and the town hall.

The hamlet of Riverton holds a post office (ZIP Code 06065), the Riverton General Store, the Riverton Inn, the Royal Coachman Tavern, the Riverton Congregational Church, the grange, and the fair grounds. This is also the location of the annual Riverton Fair, which takes place the second weekend of October each year, and is Connecticut's last fair of the year.

The West Branch of the Farmington River is designated as a Wild and Scenic River. It runs through the villages of Riverton and Pleasant Valley and hosts fishermen year-round in the catch-and-release section. On the opening day of fishing season each year, a fishing tournament is held in Riverton, drawing anglers from Connecticut, New York, and Massachusetts.

On the National Register of Historic Places

 American Legion Forest CCC Shelter – west side of West River Road, American Legion State Forest (added in 1986)
 Barkhamsted Center Historic District – 119, 131 Center Hill Road; 2,5,6,8 Old Town Hall Road (added in 1999)
 Beaver Meadow Complex Prehistoric Archeological District (added in 1988)
 Lighthouse Archeological Site (5-37) (added in 1991)
 William Moore Jr. House – 5 Mountain Road (added May 14, 1999)
 Old Riverton Inn – 436 E. River Rd. (added in 1992)
 Peoples Forest Museum – Greenwood Road, Peoples State Forest (added in 1986)
 Riverton Historic District – (added in 2007)
 Union Church/St. Paul's Church – Riverton Road (added in 1985)

References

External links

Official town website
Barkhamsted Historical Society

 
Towns in Litchfield County, Connecticut
Populated places established in 1779
Towns in the New York metropolitan area
Towns in Connecticut
1779 establishments in Connecticut